The Lotus 81 was a Formula One racing car built by Colin Chapman's Lotus team for the 1980 Formula One season. Unlike many of forebears the 81 was not a terribly innovative or competitive car, coming as it did at a time when Chapman's interest in his racing activities was waning.

Instead it was a very standard ground effect design with sliding skirts and the ubiquitous Cosworth DFV 3.0 litre V8 powerplant. The car was said to generate a great deal of downforce but have excessive pitch sensitivity problems, ultimately leading Chapman to develop the innovative twin-chassis Lotus 88.

Mario Andretti and Elio de Angelis used the 81 in all 14 rounds of the 1980 Formula One world championship, and the car also gave Nigel Mansell his Formula One debut, with the British driver lining up in a total of three races that season. The best result for the car was Elio de Angelis's 2nd place in Brazil.

Chapman had intended to use the Lotus 88 for the  season, but a massive furore over the legality of the new car meant that the 81 was kept on as a stop gap for the first four races Lotus competed in, as they boycotted the 1981 San Marino Grand Prix, with Mansell taking 3rd place in the Belgian Grand Prix and de Angelis claiming three points finishes. The car was replaced by the Lotus 87.

Complete Formula One results
(key)

* Of those, 9 points were scored with the 81 model.

81
1980 Formula One season cars
1981 Formula One season cars